Naranammalpuram is a panchayat town in Tirunelveli district in the Indian state of Tamil Nadu.

Demographics
In the 2001 India census, Naranammalpuram had a population of 15,238. Males constituted 50% of the population and females 50%. Naranammalpuram had an average literacy rate of 74%, higher than the national average of 59.5%: male literacy was 79%, and female literacy was 68%. In 2001 in Naranammalpuram, 11% of the population was under 6 years of age.

In the 2011 census, Naranammalpuram had a population of 17,386.

References

Cities and towns in Tirunelveli district